A bright-line rule is an objective legal standard that does not allow courts to weigh other factors.

Bright line may also refer to:
Brightline, a rail system in Florida, USA
Bright railway line, a defunct rail line in Australia
A Spectral line
Emission spectrum of a chemical or atom